CFNJ may refer to:

 CFNJ-FM, a radio station (99.1 FM) licensed to St-Gabriel-de-Brando, Quebec, Canada
 Christ for the Nations Japan, a religious educational institute in Japan

Broadcast call sign disambiguation pages